Unio may refer to:

 Unio (bivalve), a genus of freshwater mussels
 Unio (sternwheeler), a steamboat that operated in Oregon, United States, in 1861, before being renamed Union
 UNI/O, an asynchronous serial bus
 UNIO Satu Mare, a Romanian machine-building company
  or Confederation of Unions for Professionals, a national trade union center in Norway

See also
 Unio Mystica, the union of the individual human soul with the Godhead
 Unio Trium Nationum, a 1438 pact formed by the three Estates of Transylvania
 Convergència i Unió, a political party in Catalonia
 Unió Democràtica de Catalunya, a political party in Catalonia
 Unió Valenciana, a political party in Valencia
 Unió Mallorquina, a political party on Majorca